The Komazawa Volleyball Courts are a volleyball venue located in Tokyo, Japan. It hosted some of the volleyball preliminaries for the 1964 Summer Olympics.

Originally an outdoor venue for the 1958 Asian Games, the venue was modified into an indoor arena between December 1962 and June 1964. It seated 3,908 during the Olympics, including 1,300 temporary.

References
1964 Summer Olympics official report. Volume 1. Part 1. p. 126.
1964 Summer Olympics official report. Volume 2. Part 2. p. 621.

Venues of the 1964 Summer Olympics
Defunct indoor arenas in Japan
Olympic volleyball venues
Sports venues in Tokyo
Volleyball venues in Japan
Buildings and structures in Setagaya